Herman Camille Oponga Ayessa (born January 24, 1978, in Brazzaville) is a Congolese former professional footballer who played as a defender.

External links
 
 
 

1978 births
Living people
Republic of the Congo footballers
Republic of the Congo expatriate footballers
Republic of the Congo international footballers
2000 African Cup of Nations players
Association football defenders
AS Cannes players
Falkirk F.C. players
Red Star F.C. players
Sportspeople from Brazzaville
Pacy Ménilles RC players
Pau FC players
Villemomble Sports players
ES Viry-Châtillon players
Expatriate footballers in France
Expatriate footballers in Scotland
Republic of the Congo expatriate sportspeople in France